Murray Joe Tynch III (born March 4, 1964) is a retired United States Navy rear admiral and naval aviator who last served as the commander of Task Force 73 and Logistics Group Western Pacific (COMLOG WESTPAC) and dual-hatted as the Singapore Area Coordinator from June 12, 2018 to July 26, 2021. As CTF 73/CLWP, he provides the United States Seventh Fleet with combat-ready logistics and maintains and operates government-owned ships and operating government-contracted vessels to sustain combatant ships and units throughout Seventh Fleet's area of operations.

He relieved Captain Daniel Dusek as commanding officer after a Department of Defense investigation was launched into Dusek's activities. He was also Secretary of the Joint Staff (SJS) from August 2009 to June 2012.

He relinquished command of WESTPAC and CTF-73 to Philip Sobeck in 2021 in a private ceremony due to the COVID-19 pandemic in Singapore.

Early life and education
A native of North Carolina, Tynch is a graduate of the University of North Carolina at Chapel Hill and received his commission from the Aviation Officer Candidate School in July 1988. He was selected as the Naval Helicopter Association’s (NHA) Instructor Pilot of the Year in 1998 and the NHA’s Pilot of the Year in 2005.

Personal life
Tynch is the son of Murray Joe Tynch Jr. and Patsy Jean (Holliday) Tynch.

References

1964 births
Living people
People from Chowan County, North Carolina
University of North Carolina at Chapel Hill alumni
Military personnel from North Carolina
United States Naval Aviators
Recipients of the Air Medal
National War College alumni
Recipients of the Meritorious Service Medal (United States)
Recipients of the Legion of Merit
United States Navy rear admirals (lower half)
Recipients of the Defense Superior Service Medal